Çandır is a district of Yozgat Province, Turkey.

Çandır may also refer to the following places in Turkey:

 Çandır, Çivril
 Çandır, Enez
 Çandır, Kalecik a village in Kalecik district of Ankara Province
 Çandır, Mersin a village in Toroslar district of Mersin Province
 Çandır Castle, a Byzantine castle near the village
 Çandır, Serik a village in Serik district of Antalya Province

See also
 Çandırlar, Feke, a village in Feke district of Adana Province, Turkey
 Çandar